Los Lobos may refer to:

 Los Lobos, an American rock band from East Los Angeles, California
 Los Lobos del Este de Los Angeles, first album by Los Lobos
 Los Lobos (Baby Rasta & Gringo album), music album by Baby Rasta & Gringo
 Los Lobos (film), a 2019 Mexican family drama film
 Los Lobos, Texas, a census-designated place in Zapata County, Texas, United States

See also 
 Lobos (disambiguation)